Vlkanov is the name of several places in the Czech Republic:

 Vlkanov (Domažlice District), a village in Domažlice District
 Vlkanov (Havlíčkův Brod District), a village in Havlíčkův Brod District